Poselye is a rural locality (a selo) in Ivolginsky District, Republic of Buryatia, Russia. The population was 3,797 as of 2010. There are 128 streets.

Geography 
Poselye is located 22 km northeast of Ivolginsk (the district's administrative centre) by road. Soldatsky is the nearest rural locality.

References 

Rural localities in Ivolginsky District